Arthur Staples (4 February 1899 – 9 September 1965) was an English first-class cricketer active 1924–38 who played for Nottinghamshire. He was born in Newstead, Nottinghamshire and died in Redhill, Nottinghamshire. He played in 358 first-class matches as a right-handed batsman, scoring 12,762 runs with a highest score of 153*; and as a right-arm medium pace bowler, taking 635 wickets with a best performance of seven for 20. He was awarded his county cap in 1926 and a benefit season in 1937. Staples played football in the Football League as a goalkeeper for Mansfield Town and Notts County.

References

1899 births
1965 deaths
AFC Bournemouth players
English Football League players
English cricketers
English footballers
Ilkeston Town F.C. (1880s) players
Lord Hawke's XI cricketers
Mansfield Town F.C. players
Newark Town F.C. players
Nottinghamshire cricketers
Notts County F.C. players
Players cricketers
English cricketers of 1919 to 1945
People from Newstead, Nottinghamshire
People from Arnold, Nottinghamshire
Cricketers from Nottinghamshire
Association football goalkeepers
H. D. G. Leveson Gower's XI cricketers